Bennett Ofori Ansu ( born 11 September 1995), is a Ghanaian footballer who plays as an attacking midfielder.

Club career
Ofori joined Asante Kotoko on a three-year contract in 2016. He scored goals during the 2016 Ghanaian Premier League in 2–2 and 1–1 draws with Medeama and Inter-Allies, respectively.

After leaving Asante Kotoko, Ofori signed with Medeama in February 2017.

References 

1995 births
Living people
People from Accra
Association football wingers
Ghanaian footballers
Asante Kotoko S.C. players
Medeama SC players
KF Apolonia Fier players
Kategoria e Parë
Ghanaian expatriate footballers
Expatriate footballers in Albania
Ghanaian expatriate sportspeople in Albania
Karela United FC players